Coleman is an unincorporated community in Cass County, in the U.S. state of Missouri.

History
A post office called Coleman was established in 1886, and remained in operation until 1926. The community has the name of Jack Coleman, the original owner of the town site.

References

Unincorporated communities in Cass County, Missouri
Unincorporated communities in Missouri